Alan Jenvey Rowe (29 October 1891 – 3 January 1968) was a British archaeologist most famous for his studies on ancient Egypt. Rowe was an Egyptologist and lecturer in Near Eastern Archaeology in Manchester University.

Life
Born in Deptford and raised in Essex, Rowe's work included Egypt, Cyrenaica, Australia, Palestine and Syria.

Career

Excavations
Between 1923 and 1925 he took part in a core expedition to Giza. He worked from 1928 to 1931 on the pyramid of Meidum, and surrounding areas, during this time he discovered the first royal necropolis built in a style of a royal court. His work ended due to the Great Depression of 1931.
In 1934 he led an expedition to Tel Gezer (midway between Jerusalem and Tel Aviv), but the locations identified for excavation turned out not to be workable.

In 1938 he led a team from Liverpool University to the Pyramid of Athribis, unfortunately the structure was already in such a heavily damaged state, preventing more thorough examinations. Between 1952 and 1957 Rowe surveyed and excavated tombs of the Necropolis of Cyrene, in the course of four campaigns. Rowe was the first to make an extensive archaeological study of the Necropolis of Cyrene, however, many artifacts from his excavations are considered to be lost.
Rowe published extensive findings from excavating large parts of the Serapeum of Alexandria in 1956 together with B. R. Rees, including a detailed floor plan. Rowe and Rees 1956 suggested that statues found at the Serapeum of Alexandria and Memphis Saqqara, share a similar theme, such as with Plato's Academy mosaic.

Publications
 The Four Canaanite Temples of Beth-shan, Beth-shan II:1, University Museum: Philadelphia, 1940.
New Light on Aegypto-Cyrenaean Relations: Two Ptolemaic Statues Found in Tolmeita - l'Institut français d'archéologie orientale (1948).
A Contribution to the Archaeology of the Western Desert: IV - The Great Serapeum of Alexandria (1956) (with B. R. Rees). in: Bulletin of the John Rylands Library; vol. 39 
A Contribution to the Archaeology of the Western Desert: I, II & III; in: Bulletin of the John Rylands Library; vols. 36 & 38
Studies in the Archaeology of the Near East: I & II; in: Bulletin of the John Rylands Library; vols. 43 & 44

References

1891 births
1968 deaths
British archaeologists
British Egyptologists
20th-century archaeologists
People from Deptford
Academics of the University of Manchester